Selce is a settlement southeast of Dole the Municipality of Litija in central Slovenia. The area is part of the traditional region of Lower Carniola. It is now included with the rest of the municipality in the Central Sava Statistical Region.

North of the settlement are the remains of an Iron Age hillfort with still visible earthworks and a flattened enclosure.

References

External links
Selce on Geopedia

Populated places in the Municipality of Litija